Donna Barnett (born 1942 or 1943) is a Canadian politician, who was elected to the Legislative Assembly of British Columbia in the 2009 election. She was elected as a BC Liberal member, representing the newly created riding of Cariboo-Chilcotin.

She was initially declared defeated on election night in 2009, but was subsequently declared elected over British Columbia New Democratic Party MLA Charlie Wyse after a recount.

Prior to her election to the legislature, Barnett served for 16 years as mayor of 100 Mile House.

In January 2020, Donna Barnett announced she would not run in the next provincial election.

Electoral record

|-
 
|Liberal
|Donna Barnett
|align="right"|6,259
|align="right"|47.85%
!align="right"|
!align="right"|
|-

|- bgcolor="white"
!align="right" colspan=3|Total Valid Votes
!align="right"|13,080
!align="right"|100.00%
|- bgcolor="white"
!align="right" colspan=3|Total Rejected Ballots
!align="right"|66
!align="right"|
|- bgcolor="white"
!align="right" colspan=3|Turnout
!align="right"|13,146
!align="right"|62.93%

|-
 
|NDP
| David Zirnhelt
|align="right"|6,369
|align="right"|45.37%
|align="right"|
|align="right"|$44,267
|-

|- bgcolor="white"
!align="right" colspan=3|Total Valid Votes
!align="right"|14,037
!align="right"|100.00%
!align="right"|
|- bgcolor="white"
!align="right" colspan=3|Total Rejected Ballots
!align="right"|316
!align="right"|2.20%
!align="right"|
|- bgcolor="white"
!align="right" colspan=3|Turnout
!align="right"|14,353
!align="right"|72.94%

References

British Columbia Liberal Party MLAs
Women MLAs in British Columbia
Year of birth missing (living people)
Living people
Members of the Executive Council of British Columbia
21st-century Canadian politicians
21st-century Canadian women politicians
British Columbia Social Credit Party candidates in British Columbia provincial elections
People from the Cariboo Regional District
Mayors of places in British Columbia
Women mayors of places in British Columbia